Jean Mills (born 1955) is a Canadian young adult and children's novelist, based in Guelph, Ontario. In addition to her novels and freelance writing, she has also served as a writing workshop presenter at the Eden Mills Writers' Festival and writer-in-residence at St. John's-Kilmarnock School.

Publications 

 Larkin on the Shore (Red Deer Press, 2019)
 Skating Over Thin Ice (Red Deer Press, 2018)
 Dude! (with Heather Wright) (Marden Publishing, 2014)
 Andrew and the Babysitter (writing as Lillian Stone) (Caramel Tree, 2012)
 Joey and the Firehall Ghost (writing as Lillian Stone) (Caramel Tree, 2012)
 The Ugly Duckling (writing as Lillian Stone) (Caramel Tree, 2012)
 The Toymaker's Son (Pugwash Publishers, 2009)
 Abby and the Curling Chicks (Pugwash Publishers, 2003)
 The Legacy (Nelson Canada, 1991)
 Wild Dog Summer (Nelson Canada, 1990; re-issued by Pugwash Publishers, 2008)

Reception 

 USBBY Outstanding International Books List -- Skating Over Thin Ice (2019)
 Nominee for the Forest of Reading Red Maple Award -- Skating Over Thin Ice (2019)
 Winner of the Professional Writers Association of Canada Barbara Novak Award for Memoir/Humour Writing -- "the roots of her story," published in The Globe and Mail (2009)

References 

Living people
21st-century Canadian novelists
Canadian writers of young adult literature
Women writers of young adult literature
Writers from Ontario
Queen's University at Kingston alumni
1955 births
Canadian women novelists
21st-century Canadian women writers
People from Guelph